Kulwin is terminus of the Kulwin line in Victoria, Australia. The original station was demolished in 1973, and only a mound exists of the original station today. However, grain silos are provided at this location.

References

Disused railway stations in Victoria (Australia)